Ezequiel Manzano (born 4 October 1988) is an Argentine footballer who plays as a midfielder.

Career
On 30 May 2014 Manzano made his official debut for Miami Dade FC in a 3x1 win over Nacional SC.

Clubs

References

1988 births
Living people
Italian footballers
Association football midfielders
Miami Dade FC players